Dan Neidle is a British tax lawyer and commentator, who researches and writes on issues of tax law and tax policy. He founded Tax Policy Associates, a non-profit which advises policymakers and journalists on tax policy.

Legal career
Neidle worked as a tax lawyer at international law firm Clifford Chance for 23 years, becoming its UK head of tax in 2020. Described by taxation law specialist Jolyon Maugham and tax publication ITR as possibly the UK's leading tax lawyer, his practice covered tax, cryptocurrency, public law and Brexit. He has been critical of schemes used by prominent individuals and companies to avoid tax, in favour of increased HMRC prosecution of aggressive tax avoidance and evasion, and in favour of windfall taxes on oil and gas producers (but did not support the investment allowances proposed in the UK Government's 2022 oil and gas windfall tax, saying they were just "giving money away").

Neidle advised industry groups on the 2019 Labour Party proposals to nationalise utilities, and was critical of the suggestion that investors would receive less than market value compensation. Neidle was also dismissive of Labour's 2019 tax proposals, saying there could be a £20bn revenue hole in its plans.

Tax Policy Associates
Neidle retired from Clifford Chance in May 2022 to spend time with his neoliberals  and founded Tax Policy Associates.

In April 2022, Neidle became involved in the controversy over the tax status of Akshata Murty, the wife of then-Chancellor of the Exchequer Rishi Sunak. It had been reported that Murty was a non-dom, and therefore – whilst a UK resident – was not taxed on the significant dividends she received from Infosys, the large Indian IT company founded by her father. Initially Murty claimed that this was an inevitable consequence of her being an Indian national who had moved to the UK; Neidle described this claim as incorrect and "a disgrace", saying that in fact a person had to actively claim to be taxed on this basis. In Neidle's view, Murty's position raised a question as to whether the Chancellor had a conflict of interest, given he was responsible for the UK's tax rules. Neidle then raised wider questions as to whether the non-dom regime made sense, calling it a "bizarre disincentive on UK investment".

In May 2022, Neidle published a report revealing the scale of UK taxpayers' holdings in offshore accounts, and criticised HMRC for not using this data to estimate the scale of offshore tax evasion. HMRC subsequently agreed to produce and publish estimates.

In September 2022, Neidle argued that the way former chancellor Rishi Sunak had structured the energy profits levy (or "windfall tax") announced in May meant that at least £5bn of potential tax revenues had been lost.

Later that year, International Tax Review listed Neidle as one of the 50 most influential people in the world of tax policy and business.

Nadhim Zahawi
In July 2022, Neidle published a report suggesting that the Chancellor of the Exchequer, Nadhim Zahawi, had used an offshore trust, owned by his parents, to hold his founder stake in YouGov, when he founded it with Stephan Shakespeare in 2000. Neidle's view was that the Chancellor was ultimately responsible for the UK tax code, and that the public had a right to know if there were specific and obscure provisions of that code from which he personally benefits.

Zahawi initially explained the offshore holding by saying that his father had provided YouGov with startup capital. Neidle analysed YouGov's filings and found no evidence that this was the case. In Neidle's view this meant that either he had made a mistake, YouGov's filings were wrong, or Zahawi was lying. Zahawi did not respond, but then provided a new explanation for the offshore holding: that Zahawi "had no experience of running a business at the time and so relied heavily on the support and guidance of his father, who was an experienced entrepreneur". Neidle responded to this by accusing Zahawi of lying. In response, Zahawi instructed law firm Osborne Clarke to write to Neidle asking him to retract his accusation by the end of the day. The letter was stated to be without prejudice, and Osborne Clarke asserted that he was not entitled to publish the letter, or even refer to it, and it would be a "serious matter" if he did.

Neidle did not retract, but instead set out his reasoning in more detail. Osborne Clarke responded with a second letter, which claimed it was not a libel threat, but Neidle nevertheless interpreted as a libel threat. Neidle believed that the assertions of confidentiality were false, and that the letters were an attempt to intimidate him, and he therefore published the letters. Neidle also wrote to the Solicitors Regulation Authority asking them to outlaw the practice of lawyers writing libel letters and claiming they were confidential and could not be published. Richard Moorhead, Professor of Law and Professional Ethics at the University of Exeter, wrote that, in claiming that their letters could not be published, Osborne Clarke may have been (knowingly or recklessly) complicit in an attempt to mislead Neidle. Moorhead agreed with Neidle that the SRA should take a hard look at claims of confidentiality in SLAPP (Strategic Lawsuits Against Public Participation) letters.

The Times''' legal editor, Jonathan Ames described the situation as ironic, given that the Government had just published draft legislation that would crack down on strategic lawsuits against public participation.

In January 2023, The Guardian was told that, the previous month, Zahawi had agreed a "contractual settlement" with HMRC, paying £3.7m of tax and a 30% penalty, plus interest. Neidle had estimated in July 2022 that the tax Zahawi owed was £3.7 million. Following a subsequent investigation by the Independent Adviser on Ministers' Interests, the Prime Minister dismissed Zahawi on 29 January 2023.

 References 

External links
 Tax Policy Associates
 How I cost Nadhim Zahawi £3.7million - New European'' article by Neidle

British lawyers
Tax lawyers
English lawyers
Living people
Alumni of the University of Bristol
Year of birth missing (living people)